A breastplate (used interchangeably with breastcollar, breaststrap and breastgirth) is a piece of riding equipment used on horses. Its purpose is to keep the saddle or harness from sliding back.

On riding horses, it is most helpful on horses with large shoulders and a flat ribcage. It is also a safety feature, especially on cross-country, should a rider's girth or billets break, as the rider will have enough time to stop the horse and dismount before the saddle slipped off the animal's back or underneath its belly. The breastplate is used on both English and Western saddles.  When used in English riding, the hunting breastplate is made of thinner straps of leather, as is the western style used for horse shows.  Working western horses in disciplines that involve work with cattle use a thicker, sturdier style.

History 
When the Spanish Conquistador Cortez invaded Mexico in 1519 his small group of cavalry men all rode the old centerfire rigged War Saddle. Since the saddle was prone to slip back on the horse, a breast collar was used, usually with a shoulder strap to hold it up. And, a crupper under the horse's tail and attached to the saddle was also required to maintain stability.

From the formation of the American cavalry in 1812 military saddles were single cinched and both a breast collar and crupper were used. Many Civil War photos show horses rigged with these pieces of equipment. It wasn't until the McClellan saddle was adapted that they were discarded.

Early Mexican vaqueros soon moved the front cinch forward, hanging the rigging directly under the fork, and solved the problem of saddle slippage. The un-needed breast collar was discarded, probably because it would catch on limbs when chasing a cow through brush. Both North American cowboys and South American gauchos followed their example and breast collars were seldom seen. The Texas development of the full double rigging in the early 1800s added even more saddle security.

Only on the Pacific Coast and Nevada ranges did the centerfire rigging remain popular. A martingale of the time (a leather loop around the horse's neck with an additional strap down to the cinch) helped stabilize the saddle in addition to being a fashion accent.

The rise of contest roping in the early 1900s returned the breast collar to popularity. While the first generation of contest hands didn't use one, those that followed learned that a breast collar was necessary. It not only kept the saddle in place during a hard start but was a “plus” when they laid their slack behind a 900-pound steer and rode by for the trip. It was also a handy place to tuck up the 2nd rope that they carried. The calf ropers and steer wrestlers quickly followed by example. By 1940, the majority of timed event contestants used a breast collar.

Harness

The breastcollar harness is one of two standard harness designs, the other being the collar and hames design.  The breastcollar harness is used to pull light loads, such as at horse shows and for harness racing.  It can only be used for lighter loads because it places the weight of the load on the sternum of the horse, which is not suitable for heavy pulling, plus it can put pressure on the windpipe and reduce a horse's air supply.

The hunting or stockman's breastplate

Being the classic breastplate for English riding, campdrafting or stockwork, the stockman's or hunting breastplate is the most common type. It consists of a yoke (with a neck and wither strap), a breast strap at the bottom of the yoke which runs through the horse's front legs and attaches to the girth, and two straps at the top of the yoke which attach to the D-rings of a saddle. There are usually buckles for adjusting the size of the yoke as well as the length of the straps which attach to the saddle and girth. The hunting breastplate not only helps to prevent the saddle from slipping, but also may be used to attach a Market Harborough or standing and running martingales, which are clipped or buckled onto a ring at the chest.

The hunting breastplate is most commonly made of leather, and some have elastic inserts on the yoke to help prevent it from restricting the horse's shoulders. Those used in endurance riding are commonly made of lightweight nylon or another synthetic material.

The hunting breastplate is worn by endurance horses, show hunters, fox hunters, equitation horses, eventers (it can be seen used in all three phases), and show jumpers. It is also occasionally see in flat racing, as well as steeplechase.

Disadvantages
Because the hunting breastplate is attached to the D-rings of the saddle (which are known to be pulled out under great pressure), it is not as reliable as equipment attached to the saddle by means of the billets. Therefore, the breastcollar is sometimes preferred on cross-country.

The hunting breastplate also tends to have a restrictive effect on the shoulder, even when correctly fitted.

Additionally, a hunting breastplate may cause the tree points of a poorly fitting saddle to dig into the sides of the horse's withers, creating rubs and great discomfort. In this case, it is best to get the saddle properly fitted before using a hunting breastplate.

Western styles

The variation of a breastplate used for western riding is referred to as a breast collar. The term "breastplate" is occasionally used, though western riders generally use "breast collar" to refer to both designs. A working western breast collar may be of either a breastplate or breastcollar design.  attach to the d-rings that hold the latigo of the cinch, while one suitable for a horse show may attach to decorative dees located above the cinch rings, nearer the swells of the saddle.  In either case, an additional strap usually runs between the front legs and attaches to the cinch.  Some, though not all breastcollars for western riding also have a wither strap.

Fitting
The breastplate should not be fitted in any way that will restrict the horse's movement. Special attention should be paid to the shoulders, chest, and the area between the horse's front legs. In general, a fist should fit between breastplate and the horse's chest, and there should be a hand's width between the wither strap and the withers. The breast strap should have some slack, and care should be taken that its buckle doesn't rub the sensitive skin in the area.  It should also be adjusted so that the chest straps lie above the point of the shoulder so that the horse's motion is not restricted.

The breastcollar or polo breastplate

The breastcollar consists of a chest strap, which buckles to one billet of the saddle, runs around the horse's chest, and attaches to the first billet on the other side. It also has a wither strap, which is used to adjust the height of the breastcollar, and prevents it from slipping down too far. The breastcollar is often made of leather, strong elastic, or webbing.

The breastcollar is more secure than the hunting breastplate, because it attaches to either the front billet of the saddle, or to the front branch of a split-end girth (which is even more secure). It is therefore most desirable in eventing, especially on the cross-country phase, polo, and  other jumping disciplines. It is not used in dressage, hunt seat, or equitation.

This style of breastcollar does not interfere with the horse's shoulders, as some other styles can do.  However, this style may interfere with the horse's ability to breathe when it puts its head far down.  Thus, this style is not desirable for jumping and riding in steep terrain.

Disadvantages
 Tends to restrict the shoulders more so than other breastplates.

Fitting
The breastcollar should be fitted so the chest strap is horizontal from chest to girth. The wither strap should be adjusted so that it is not so low that it interferes with the horse's shoulders, or so high that it presses against the animal's windpipe. As a general rule, a fist should fit between the wither strap of the breastcollar and the withers, and the chest strap and the chest of the horse.

Breastgirth or loop breastplate

The breastgirth is made of strong elastic, and runs from either the D-rings of the saddle, or is attached to a loop that runs around the saddle's stirrup bars. Although similar to the breastcollar, there is no wither strap. Breastcollars are usually seen in show jumping and eventing (usually on the cross-country phase). They are desirable because they tend to be less-restrictive to the shoulders, so the horse is better able to pick up his front legs and fold over a jump.

Fitting
If the breastgirth is not adjusted correctly, it will restrict the horse's breathing because it will press on the windpipe. Additionally, it is not as secure as the breastcollar when it is attached to the D-rings.  The breastgirth should be adjusted so it does not restrict the horse's breathing. It should cross at the base of the neck, and may be adjusted snugly.

References

Horse harness
Saddles

pl:Podpierśnik